A New Perspective is a 1964 studio album by jazz trumpeter Donald Byrd. It was released on the Blue Note label as BLP 4124 and BST 84124.

In 2017, it was ranked at number 194 on Pitchforks list of the "200 Best Albums of the 1960s". The album was remastered by Rudy Van Gelder in 1998.

Inspiration 
About the project, Byrd said: "I mean this album seriously. Because of my own background, I've always wanted to write an entire album of spiritual-like pieces. The most accurate way I can describe what we were all trying to do is that this is a modern hymnal. In an earlier period, the New Orleans jazzmen would often play religious music for exactly what it was - but with their own jazz textures and techniques added. Now, as modern jazzmen, we're also approaching this tradition with respect and great pleasure."

Track listing

Personnel 
 Donald Byrd – trumpet
 Hank Mobley – tenor saxophone
 Herbie Hancock – piano
 Kenny Burrell – guitar
 Donald Best – vibraphone, vocals
 Butch Warren – bass
 Lex Humphries – drums
 Duke Pearson – arranger
 Coleridge-Taylor Perkinson – choir direction
 Unidentified vocalists: Four men (two basses, two tenors) and four women (two altos, two sopranos)
Technical
Rudy Van Gelder - recording
Reid Miles - cover design, cover photography

Charts

References

Further reading

External links 
 

1964 albums
Albums arranged by Duke Pearson
Albums produced by Alfred Lion
Albums recorded at Van Gelder Studio
Blue Note Records albums
Donald Byrd albums
Hard bop albums